Mandarin Oriental, Barcelona is a hotel located on Passeig de Gràcia in Barcelona, Spain.  The Mandarin Oriental, Barcelona opened in November 2009 and was designed by a team of Spanish architects and designers: Carlos Ferrater and Joan Trias de Bes (architecture) and Patricia Urquiola (interior design).  The hotel's 98 guest rooms and suites are housed in a re-developed, mid-20th Century building that was once home to a bank. Mandarin Oriental, Barcelona also includes The Spa at Mandarin Oriental, Barcelona and five restaurants and bars, including Moments, a Catalan restaurant headed up by Carme Ruscalleda, a Michelin-starred chef.

Location
Mandarin Oriental, Barcelona is located in the city's commercial and entertainment district on Passeig de Gràcia.  Several of the city’s major tourist attractions are located close to the hotel, including the Gothic Quarter,  Las Ramblas, and Gaudi's Casa Milà ("La Pedrera") and Casa Batlló. A number of Barcelona's museums, churches and parks are located near the hotel as well.

The hotel
The Mandarin Oriental, Barcelona, named "Best City Hotel" in the 2011 Tatler Travel Guide, is housed in a renovated mid-20th century building and offers views of Passeig de Gràcia on one side and views of the hotel's landscaped interior garden on the other side.  

Wellness amenities at the hotel include The Spa at Mandarin Oriental, Barcelona, a 12-meter indoor lap pool and a fitness center with personal trainers on staff. The hotel also has five restaurants and bars as well as meeting and reception spaces.

The Spa
The Spa at Mandarin Oriental, Barcelona is a day spa that has eight private treatment rooms as well as two couples' suites.  Four multi-functional rooms, two Oriental rooms with Thai futons and vitality baths, a relaxation area, an Oriental herbal steam room, rainforest experience showers, a manicure/pedicure studio and a spa boutique help round out The Spa facilities at Mandarin Oriental, Barcelona.

Restaurants and bars
Restaurants and bars:

Moments: a ** Michelin-star recipient serving Catalan cuisine 
Terrat: a dining outlet located near the pool on the 9th floor reserved for hotel guests
Blanc: a Mediterranean brasserie with an all-day menu 
Mimosa Garden: a lunch or supper establishment in Mandarin Oriental, Barcelona's courtyard with landscape design by Beth Figueras
Banker's Bar: a cocktail lounge with a design aesthetic influenced by the bank that once occupied the space

See also
Mandarin Oriental Hotel Group

External links
 Mandarin Oriental, Barcelona Website

References

Mandarin Oriental Hotel Group
Hotels in Barcelona
Michelin Guide starred restaurants in Spain